Alpha Mission, known as  in Japan, is a vertically scrolling shooter game developed by SNK and released for arcades in 1985, by Namco in Japan and Tradewest in North America. It was later ported to the Famicom in 1986 and released for the Nintendo Entertainment System in 1987.

The arcade game was a commercial success in Japan, where it was the seventh highest-grossing table arcade game of 1986. A sequel, Alpha Mission II, was released for the Neo Geo arcade system in 1991.

Gameplay
Alpha Mission is a one-player scrolling shooter game in its segregation of air-to-air and air-to-ground weapons. Missiles are used to destroy ground enemies, while laser-like weapons are used for aerial opponents. Throughout each of the levels, the player must fight off waves of enemies that threaten several space stations and a boss must be defeated at the end of each. Like most early games in this genre, when the player dies, all weapons are lost and the player is moved to a point slightly before the point of death. The player's craft can also be upgraded to have more powerful weapons by picking up various power-ups throughout the level.

Release
Alpha Mission was released on the PlayStation Portable as part of PSP Minis via PlayStation Store in 2011. Alpha Mission was also released on the Nintendo Switch in the Nintendo eShop on 25 October 2018 and on the PlayStation 4 via PlayStation Store on 18 July 2019 by Hamster Corporation as part of their Arcade Archives series. The game is also included on SNK 40th Anniversary Collection, the collection has both the original arcade and the NES version. It includes both the Japanese version and the Western/international version.

Reception 
In Japan, Game Machine listed ASO on their December 1, 1985 issue as being the second most-successful table arcade cabinet of the month. It was later listed by Game Machine as Japan's fifth highest-grossing table arcade game during the first half of 1986, and it was the seventh overall highest-grossing table arcade game of 1986.

Notes

External links
 Alpha Mission at Arcade-History

References 

1985 video games
Arcade video games
Nintendo Entertainment System games
Nintendo Switch games
PlayStation Network games
PlayStation 4 games
Vertically scrolling shooters
Science fiction video games
SNK franchises
SNK games
SNK Playmore games
Video games developed in Japan
Hamster Corporation games
Single-player video games